PT Indofood Sukses Makmur Tbk is a major Indonesian company involved in the food industry. The company's headquarters are located in South Jakarta, Jakarta.

History 
Indofood was founded in 1968 as Lambang Insan Makmur, an instant noodles business, with its brand Indomie launching in 1972. The company restructured on 14 August 1990 as PT Panganjaya Intikusuma. In 1994, the company was renamed to PT Indofood Sukses Makmur, and was listed on the Indonesian Stock Exchange on 14 July 1994. It is one of the companies owned by the family of Sudono Salim under the Salim Group.

In January 2013, as part of a filing for the Indonesia Stock Exchange, Indofood said it is planning to buy 50% of Brazilian sugar-cane processor Companhia Mineira de Açúcar e Álcool Participações, (CMAA) for $72 million.

On 17 February 2021, Indofood CBP has officially purchased all of the shares owned by Fritolay Netherlands Holding B.V., an affiliate of PepsiCo at PT Indofood Fritolay Makmur (IFL) worth IDR 494 billion, so that the production of Lay's, Cheetos and Doritos brand snacks in Indonesia will be stopped on 18 August 2021. IFL was then renamed into PT Indofood Fortuna Makmur. In addition, PepsiCo and its affiliates has also agreed not to produce, package, sell, market or distribute snack products that compete with IFL products in Indonesia for a period of three years. Instead, Lay's, Cheetos and Doritos in the Indonesian market have been rebranded into Chitato Lite, Chiki Twist and Maxicorn, respectively.

Products

Indofood instant noodle products 
 Indomie
 Pop Mie
 Sarimi
 Supermi
 Sakura
 Intermi
 Mi Telur Cap 3 Ayam

Indofood sauce & seasoning products 
 Indofood Sambal (Chili Sauce)
 Indofood Tomato Ketchup
 Indofood Soy Sauce
 Indofood Instant Seasoning
 Racik

Indofood snack products 
 Chiki
 Chitato
 Jet-Z
 Qtela
 Maxicorn (rebrand from Doritos)
 Chiki Twist (rebrand from Cheetos)
 Chitato Lite (rebrand from Lays)

Indofood baby food & cereal products 
 Promina
 SUN
 GoVit
 GoWell (rebrand from Provita)

Indofood dairy products 
 Indomilk
 Cap Enaak
 Tiga Sapi
 Kremer
 Orchid Butter
 Milkuat acquired from Danone
 Indofood Ice Cream
 Puregrow Organic
 Lurpak (imported product from Arla)
 Castello (imported product from Arla)
 Puck (imported product from Arla)
 Arla (imported product from Arla)

Indofood Bogasari flour & pasta products 
 Cakra Kembar
 Segitiga Biru
 Kunci Biru
 Lencana Merah
 Taj Mahal
 La Fonte
 Sedani

Indofood oil & margarine products 
 Bimoli
 Palmia (rebrand from Simas after end JV with Sinarmas under Sajang Heulang Name)
 Happy Salad Oil
 Amanda
 Delima

Indofood beverage products 
 Freiss
 Ichi Ocha
 Club
 Fruitamin

Indofood confectionery products 
 Choco Pie (under license from Lotte)
 Pepero (under license from Lotte)
 Lotte Bubble Gum (under license from Lotte)
 Dueto
 Inti Gandum (previously named as Keebler Digestive Biscuits)
 Wonderland
 Lotte Xylitol (under license from Lotte)

Overseas expansion 
In January 2015, Indofood built an instant noodles factory in Morocco and it is to be opened in Q3 2015. It is the sixth plant in Africa after Nigeria, Egypt, Sudan, Kenya and Ethiopia, and is the biggest overseas Indomie factory.

Palm oil 
In January 2019, Indofood withdrew from the Roundtable on Sustainable Palm Oil (RSPO) certification scheme.

References

External links 
Official website

1990 establishments in Indonesia
1994 initial public offerings
Food and drink companies established in 1990
Food and drink companies of Indonesia
Manufacturing companies based in Jakarta
Indonesian brands
Companies listed on the Indonesia Stock Exchange
Indonesian companies established in 1990